Sulaymaniyah, also spelled as Slemani, is a city in the east of the Kurdistan Region of Iraq, not far from the Iran–Iraq border. It is surrounded by the Azmar, Goizha and Qaiwan Mountains in the northeast, Baranan Mountain in the south and the Tasluja Hills in the west. The city has a semi-arid climate with very hot dry summers and cold wet winters.

From its foundation Sulaymaniyah was always a center of great poets, writers, historians, politicians, scholars and singers, such as Nalî, Mahwi, and Piramerd. The modern city of Sulaymaniyah was founded in 1784 by the Ottoman-Kurdish prince Ibrahim Pasha Baban, who named it after his father Sulaiman Pasha. Sulaymaniyah was the capital of the historic principality of Baban from 1784 to 1850.

History

The region of Sulaymaniyah was known as Zamwa prior to the foundation of the modern city in 1784. The capital of the Kurdish Baban principality (1649–1850), before Sulaymaniyah, was a territory named "Qelaçiwalan". At the time of the Babani's rule there were major conflicts between the Safavid dynasty and the Ottoman Empire. Qelaçiwalan became a battleground for the two rivals.

Being of strategic importance and lying deep inside Safavid territory, there was concern that Qelaçiwalan would be attacked and captured if the Babani did not give the Safavids military support, as both Sultan Mahmud II and Nader Shah were trying to gain the support of the dispersed Kurdish Emirates. This obliged Mahmud Pasha of Baban in 1781 to think about moving the center of the emirate to a safer place.

In 1783, Ibrahim Pasha Baban became ruler of the emirate and began the reconstruction of a city which once constructed by Ottoman Sultan Sulaiman (the name of Sulaimaniyah came from his name) new city which would become its capital. In 1784 he finished erecting a number of palaces for trade called Qeyserîs and bazaars, which were also used as baths, and began inviting people from the surrounding villages and emirates to move to the newly established city. Soon Melkendî, which was originally intended to be the city itself, instead became one of its quarters. The new city of Sulaymaniyah was named after Sulaiman Baba, who was the first Baban prince to gain control of the province of Şarezûr.  Sulaiman Baba invaded the neighboring Kurdish vassaldom of Ardalan, defeating their forces in 1694. Ottoman Sultan Mustafa II assigned him the district of Baban.

In the early 1800s refugees from Ardalan moved to Sulaymaniyah, including Mastura Ardalan, the widow of Xosraw Xanî Erdalan, the ruler of the kingdom. Erdalan wrote an account of Kurdish history in Persian and was buried in Sulaymaniyah when he died in 1848.

From 1922 to 1924, Sulaymaniyah was the capital of the Kingdom of Kurdistan, a short-lived unrecognized state declared by Iraqi Kurds following the collapse of the Ottoman Empire.

Demographics
In 1820, only 36 years after the creation of the city, a British man named Rech visited the city and estimated that its population was more than ten thousand, containing 2,144 families of which 2,000 were Muslim, 130 Jewish, and 14 Christian.

Ottoman documents from 1907 suggest that there were 8,702 Muslim and 360 non-Muslim residents living in the city at that time.

The Peshkawtin newspaper which was distributed in Sulaymaniyah in 1920 estimated its population to be around ten thousand.

According to Iraqi government documents, by 1947 the number of residents had increased to 23,475; by 1998 to 548,747, and in 2015 to an estimated 656,100.

The American University of Iraq, Sulaimani estimated the number of inhabitants in 2016 at 800,000

Geography and climate 

The city is located in northern Iraq and Southern Kurdistan. Of the main population centers in the country, it is characterized by its cooler summer temperatures and its rainier winters. In the winters, there can be a significant amount of snow. Snow falls every year or two.

The Köppen-Geiger climate classification system classifies its climate as hot-summer Mediterranean climate (Csa).

Education 
The University of Sulaymaniyah was opened in 1968 with instruction in Kurdish, Arabic, and English. It has faculties in engineering, agriculture, the arts, science, and medicine. It is the largest university in the Kurdistan Region. A second university, Sulaimani Polytechnic University was established in 2012, also teaching in Kurdish, English and Arabic.

In 2007 The American University of Iraq – Sulaimani, (AUI-S) was a new addition to the American universities in the Middle East, graduating its fifth class in 2016. Instruction at this private, not-for-profit liberal arts university is in English only, featuring a US-accredited program in English as a Second Language (ESL). There are a number of other private universities.

Culture

Two independent newspapers Hawlati and Awena and two independent political magazines Lvin and Shock, are published and distributed in Sulaymaniyah city. Since 2016, there exists an International Film Festival in the city which is organized by the College of Fine Arts of the University of Sulaymanya. 

Sulaymaniyah is the only city in South Kurdistan that regularly celebrates World Music Day or Fête de la Musique. In one trip to the city, a journalist working for the BBC wrote about Sulaymaniyah's distinct culture:"Culture is hugely important to the Kurdish people, especially in Sulaymaniyah, but there is a strong pull to the west—modernisation and consumerism—driven perhaps by the satellite televisions they have had access to since they started running their own affairs...And at the university, students mill around the campus, chattering with each other and doing some last-minute cramming for their exams. The war only stopped lectures for a few weeks. There are probably more women than men and they are happy to air their views to anyone who asks."

Economy 

Since 2003, Sulaymaniyah has experienced a growing local economy. Its economy today relies on tourism, agriculture and a number of small factories, most of which are involved in the building trade.

In 2004 the Comprehensive Food Security and Vulnerability Analysis in Iraq released an in-depth survey of the Sulaymaniyah Governorate in which they surveyed each city. In this survey, one can see the economic boom of 2003 mentioned earlier.

Tourism

The city was visited by more than 60,000 tourists in 2009.
Sulaymaniyah attracted more than 15,000 Iranian tourists in the first quarter of 2010, many drawn by the fact it is not subject to strict laws faced at home. Newroz 2010 drew an exodus of Iranian tourists choosing to celebrate the event in the region.

Museum 
Sulaimani Museum: It is the second biggest museum after the national museum in Baghdad. It is home to many Mesopotamian, Kurdish and ancient Persian artifacts dating back to 1792–1750 BC.
Amna Suraka museum
Museum of Modern Art (Mozehanai Hunari Howchah)
Sulaimani Archeological Museum

Notable People from Slemani (Sulaimanyah)

 Barham Salih, 8th president of Iraq

 Khâlid-i Baghdâdî (1779–1827), sufist and Islamic thinker
 Salim (1800–1866), poet
 Nalî (1800–1873), poet
 Mahwi (1830–1906), poet
 Said Pasha Kurd, (1834–1907), Ottoman statesman
 Şerif Pasha, (1865–1951), Ottoman diplomat, ambassador and statesman
 Mustafa Yamulki (1866–1936), Minister of Education in the Kingdom of Kurdistan
 Haji Mala Saeed Kirkukli Zada (1866–1937), Minister of Justice in the Kingdom of Kurdistan
 Piramerd Tawfeq Mahmoud Hamza, (1867–1950), poet and journalist
 Mevlanzade Rifat Bey, (1869 - 1930), journalist and politician
 Muhamed Amin Zaki (1880–1948), historian, statesman and politician
 Taufiq Wahby (1891–1984), linguist, politician and poet
 Sheikh Nuri Sheikh Salih Sheikh Ghani Barzinji (1896–1958), journalist and poet
 Ahmad Mukhtar Baban (1900–1976), prime Minister of Iraq 1958
 Abdulla Goran (1904–1962), founder of modern Kurdish poetry
 Ibrahim Ahmad (1914–2000), novelist, poet and translator
 Jamal Nebez (1933-2018),  Kurdish linguist, mathematician, politician, author, translator and writer.
 Nawshirwan Mustafa (1944–2017), politician, historian and media proprietor
 Ahmad Hardi (1922–2006), poet
 Sherko Bekas (1940–2013), contemporary poet
 Bachtyar Ali (born 1960), novelist
 Muhamad Salih Dilan (1927–1990), musician and poet
 Shahab Sheikh Nuri (1932–1976), politician
 Dilshad Meriwani, (1947–1989), actor, poet, writer and journalist
 Rizgar Mohammed Amin (born 1958), judge
 Mahmoud Othman (born 1938), politician
 Jalal Talabani (1933-2017), 6th president of Iraq
 Mahir Hassan (born 1963), actor and playwright
 Shwan Kamal (born 1967), artist
 Sara Omar (1986-), the first internationally recognized female novelist from Sulaymaniyah

Sites
 Tomb of king Cyaxares of Media, Qyzqapan

Politics
In recent years, many people in Sulaymaniyah have distanced themselves from Kurdish nationalism as the Kurdistan Workers Party is experiencing a surge.

Twin towns – sister cities
 Tucson, Arizona.
 Naples.

See also 
 List of largest cities of Iraq
 2011 Kurdish protests in Iraq
 Chaldean Catholic Archeparchy of Kirkuk-Sulaimaniya (former Eastern Catholic diocese)
 Duhok
 Dohuk Governorate
 Erbil
 Erbil Governorate
 Kurdistan
 Kurds
 Ranya
 Saray Azadi
 Sulaymaniyah Governorate

References

External links 

 
Cities in Iraqi Kurdistan
District capitals of Iraq
Populated places in Sulaymaniyah Province
Populated places established in 1784
Kurdish settlements in Iraq